The Talk of the Town is the first novel written by Ardal O'Hanlon, published by Sceptre in 1998. It was renamed Knick Knack Paddy Whack for publication in the United States.

The novel is set in 1980s Ireland and is about life in a small Irish town, where everyone knows every one else's business. Its tone is humorous but dark. The main character is Patrick Scully, a hapless youth with few prospects.

1998 novels
Irish comedy novels
Irish young adult novels
Novels set in Ireland
Fiction set in the 1980s
Sceptre (imprint) books
1998 debut novels